AdventHealth (formerly Adventist Health System) is a Seventh-day Adventist non-profit health care system headquartered in Altamonte Springs, Florida, that operates facilities in 9 states across the United States. The Adventist Health System was rebranded AdventHealth on January 2, 2019. It is the largest not-for-profit Protestant health care provider and one of the largest non-profit health systems in the nation. It operates 50 hospitals in nine states, with over 8,200 licensed beds. It has 1,200 outpatient settings serving more than five million patients annually.

History
In 1973 Adventist Health System was founded.

Adventist Health System moved into a new five-story office building in Altamonte Springs that opened in 2011, to house their administrative leaders. The corporate headquarters was awarded the Energy and Environmental Design silver certificate from the U.S. Green Building Council. On April 10, 2012, construction began on a six-story office building and parking garage, next to Adventist Health Systems headquarters. The second office building opened in 2013.In 2016 construction began on a five-story office building and a seven-story parking garage, the third office building opened in 2018

On August 14, 2018, Adventist Health System announced that it would be rebranding its name to AdventHealth. Adventist Health System for two years had been working on rebranding, starting with a committee to study the topic. On January 2, 2019, the healthcare network rebranded almost all of its hospitals from Adventist Health System to AdventHealth, with the exception of those in Colorado, Illinois and Texas Health Huguley Hospital Fort Worth South.

In March 2021, AdventHealth was the 13th largest healthcare network in the United States. In 2021, it was the second largest healthcare network in Florida.

Hospitals

AdventHealth Orlando is the second largest hospital in Florida and the largest in Central Florida. AdventHealth Orlando is the 10th largest hospital in the United States in 2019. By Newsweek the best hospitals in the world in 2021 were Parker Adventist Hospital #131, AMITA Health Adventist Medical Center Hinsdale (know UChicago Medicine AdventHealth Hinsdale) #169, AdventHealth Orlando #171, Porter Adventist Hospital #201, AdventHealth Shawnee Mission #292, AMITA Health Adventist Medical Center La Grange (know UChicago Medicine AdventHealth La Grange) #298 The thirty-three best hospitals in Florida by U.S. News & World Report in 2022 were: AdventHealth Orlando #2, AdventHealth Daytona Beach #18 and AdventHealth Waterman #29. Leapfrog Group spring 2021 grades for hospitals in Florida: Grade "A" were AdventHealth Altamonte Springs, AdventHealth Apopka, AdventHealth Carrollwood, AdventHealth Celebration, AdventHealth Dade City, AdventHealth Daytona Beach, AdventHealth DeLand, AdventHealth East Orlando, AdventHealth Fish Memorial, AdventHealth Kissimmee, AdventHealth New Smyrna Beach, AdventHealth North Pinellas, AdventHealth Orlando, AdventHealth Palm Coast, AdventHealth Sebring, AdventHealth Tampa, AdventHealth Waterman, AdventHealth Wesley Chapel, AdventHealth Winter Park and AdventHealth Zephyrhills. Grade "B" were AdventHealth Heart of Florida, AdventHealth Lake Placid, AdventHealth Lake Wales and AdventHealth Ocala.

Awards
 Gallup Great Workplace Award - Adventist Health System received from Gallup the Gallup Great Workplace Award for seven consecutive years (2011–2017) for creating an engaged workplace culture that drives business outcomes.
 Chime Digital Health Most Wired Award - Adventist Health System received from College of Healthcare Information Management Executives the CHIME Digital Health Most Wired Award nine years in a row (2013–2021) for meeting specific IT requirements in four focus areas: infrastructure, business and administrative management, clinical quality and safety, and clinical integration.
 Coolest Office Spaces honoree - Adventist Health System's corporate campus, The Mardian J. Blair Administrative Center was named the 2018 Coolest Office Spaces honoree by Orlando Business Journal 
 Emerald Award - AdventHealh received Leapfrog Group's Emerald Award for the first time in 2022 for outstanding achievement by a healthcare system.

Electronic health record
In October 2002, Adventist Health System signed a six-year contract with Cerner. In February 2020, AdventHealth announced that it was leaving Cerner and that it would implement Epic Systems electronic health  record system for 37 of its hospitals. It will take over three years and approximately $650 million, there will also be ongoing maintenance costs that will be millions annually. AdventHealth began changing over to Epic Systems in March, the new system will be powered with the cloud after partnering with Virtustream.

Sports partnerships and sponsorships

Orlando Magic
On August 31,2022, AdventHealth and the Orlando Magic opened the new AdventHealth Training Center, which cost $70 million to build. The building will be the new training facility for the Orlando Magic. The 130,000-square-foot building is located one block from Amway Center AdventHealth's 33,300-square-foot medical hub treats athletes of all ages. Services offered to patients are orthopedics, primary care, sports medicine, imaging, rehabilitation and sports performance. Patients are able to see AdventHealth's gastroenterologists, cardiologists, sleep, psychology and nutrition experts. AdventHealth has been a partner with the Orlando Magic for over thirty years.

NASCAR

In 2014, Florida Hospital a subsidiary of Adventist Health System became the official healthcare provider of Daytona International Speedway. At Daytona International Speedway AdventHealth treats over 1,000 patients every year, at its two care centers and nine first aid stations. From 2016-2020, Florida Hospital later AdventHealth sponsored Chip Ganassi Racing. In October 2018, Adventist Health System bought one of the tracks injector entrances and rebranded it for $1 million to $2 million In October 2018, Florida Hospital became the sponsor of Daytona Speedweeks. In 2019 and 2021, AdventHealh sponsored Jamie McMurray who came out of retirement to race at the Daytona 500. In February of 2022, AdventHealth became the sponsor of Kansas Speedway. The tracks first aid stations and care center will have the colors of AdventHealth In January 2022, AdventHealth signed a multiyear sponsorship with Trackhouse Racing.

Health partnerships

Centura Health
In 1996, the joint venture Centura Health was founded by Adventist Health System and Catholic Health Initiatives. On February 14, 2023, Centura Health announced that it would split up.

AMITA Health

In February 2015, the joint venture AMITA Health was founded by Adventist Midwest Health part of Adventist Health System, and Alexian Health System and Presence Health both part of Ascension. On October 21, 2021, AMITA Health announced that it would split up. On April 1, 2022, AMITA Health officially split up with hospitals rebranding to AdventHealth and Ascension.

Orthopedic service
In September 2020, AdventHealth announced a partnership with Rothman Orthopaedics from Philadelphia to improve its orthopedic services in Florida. In February 2021, construction began on a new 12-story tall 300,000 square foot $100 million headquarters for Rothman Orthopaedics across from AdventHealth Orlando. In August 2022, AdventHealth Innovation Tower opened, other areas will open for Orlando Neurosurgery; AdventHealth Neuroscience Institute; and the Center for Brain Health.

In-home care
In May 2021, DispatchHealth announced a partnership with AdventHealth, to offer patients comfortable care in their own homes. This partnership would allow AdventHealth, to offer in-home care to patients in Daytona Beach, Ocala, Orlando and the Kansas City metro area. AdventHealth has been working with DispatchHealth for a few years in Tampa. Patients can receive care via phone, the DispatchHealth mobile app or website and AdventHealth's website and mobile app. They can be treated for viral infections, COPD, heart failure and more.

Kiosks
In August 2022, AdventHealth announced a partnership with SpotRx Pharmacy to install two pharmacy kiosks in Florida. The first was installed at AdventHealth Care Pavilion Westchase in Hillsborough County and at a second location at AdventHealth Care Pavilion Heathbrook in Marion County. The kiosks will shorten wait times for prescription drugs and increase their availability to patients. The kiosks also dispense over-the-counter drugs, and test strips.

University of Chicago Medicine
On September 15, 2022, the UChicago Medicine announced that it planned to acquire a controlling interest in the AdventHealth hospitals in Illinois. The joint venture became official on January 1, 2023.

Mergers
On September 1, 2010, Adventist Health System and University Community Health announced that University Community Health would merge with Adventist Health System. University Community Health owns hospitals in the counties of Hillsborough and Pasco. Adventist Health System will make $125 million in capital improvements, donating $10 million to the UCH Foundation and will assume University Community Health's liabilities. The merger would combine 43 hospitals, 37 from Adventist Health System and five from University Community Health.

COVID-19
In December 2021, AdventHealth stopped requiring its employees from being vaccinated against COVID-19. The hospital network did this after a federal judge in Missouri blocked the Centers for Medicare & Medicaid Services, which had required healthcare workers to be vaccinated.

Testifying to government
In August 2022, an executive director of the AdventHealth Transplant Institute testified before the United States Senate Committee on Finance and said that the organ transplant system had failed many patients.

See also

 AdventHealth 400
 AdventHealth Arena
 AdventHealth Championship
 AdventHealth Field
 AdventHealth Nicholson Center
 AdventHealth Stadium
 AdventHealth station
 AdventHealth Training Facility

References

External links 
 
AdventHealth's research lab looks to unlock mysteries of diabetes, obesity, aging Orlando Sentinel
49 Puerto Rican students selected for jobs in AdventHealth Florida NimB
Pasco ice skating rink billed as largest in the Southeast is open for business Tampa Bay Times
AdventHealth Field House Celebrates Grand Opening The Daily Ridge
Keep Cool This Summer at AdventHealth Center Ice The Laker/Lutz News
AdventHealth pays tribute to health care workers with new Daytona 500 Grand Marshal SUV OrmondBeachObserver.com

1973 establishments in the United States
20th-century architecture in the United States
 
Adventist organizations established in the 20th century
Companies based in Seminole County, Florida
Hospital networks in the United States
Non-profit organizations based in Florida
Organizations established in 1973